Grătiești is a commune in Sectorul Rîșcani of Chișinău municipality, Moldova. It is composed of two villages, Grătiești and Hulboaca.

References

Communes of Chișinău Municipality
Former Jewish agricultural colonies of Bessarabia